Valdemarsviks IF is a Swedish football club located in Valdemarsvik.

Background
Valdemarsviks IF currently plays in Division 4 Östergötland Östra which is the sixth tier of Swedish football. They play their home matches at the Grännäs IP in Valdemarsvik.

The club is affiliated to Östergötlands Fotbollförbund.

Season to season

In their most successful period Valdemarsviks IF competed in the following divisions:

In recent seasons Valdemarsviks IF have competed in the following divisions:

Footnotes

External links
 Valdemarsviks IF – Official website
 Valdemarsviks IF on Facebook

Football clubs in Östergötland County
Association football clubs established in 1919
1919 establishments in Sweden